The 2007 CAR Development Trophy is the fourth edition of second level rugby union tournament in Africa. The competition involves sixteen teams that are divided into two zones (North and South). Each zone is then divided into two pools of four. Each pool winner then qualifies for the final, so there is a winner for both north and south.

South Section

Pool A 
Burundi withdrew for financial reasons.

Pool B 

 Botswana Qualified due to better point score (+57) against (+39)

Final

North Section

Pool A

Pool B

Final 

Nigeria won for Burkina Faso withdraw

2007
2007 rugby union tournaments for national teams
2007 in African rugby union